Eel River Township is one of twelve townships in Hendricks County, Indiana, United States. As of the 2010 census, its population was 1,662.

History
Eel River Township was organized in about 1828.

Geography
The streams of East Fork Big Walnut Creek, Hunt Creek, Middle Fork Big Walnut Creek and Ramp Run run through this township.

Cities and towns
 Jamestown (south edge)
 North Salem

Adjacent townships
 Jackson Township, Boone County (north)
 Union Township (east)
 Center Township (southeast)
 Marion Township (south)
 Jackson Township, Putnam County (southwest)
 Clark Township, Montgomery County (west)

Cemeteries
The township contains sixteen cemeteries: Adams, Campbell, Devenport, Fairview, Fleece, Fullen, Gossett, Hypes, Kidd Farm, North Salem Baptist, Page, Pennington, Richardson, Roundtown, Trotter and Zimmerman.

Major highways
  Interstate 74
  U.S. Route 136
  Indiana State Road 75
  Indiana State Road 234
  Indiana State Road 236

Airports and landing strips
 Reynolds Landing Strip

References
 
 United States Census Bureau cartographic boundary files

Townships in Hendricks County, Indiana
Townships in Indiana